Claudio Basso is an Argentine singer born in Cipolletti, Río Negro on August 6, 1977. He was the winner of the first edition of the Argentine version of Star Academy reality show, named after the Spanish Operación Triunfo.

External links
Official site

1977 births
Living people
People from Cipolletti
21st-century Argentine male singers
Star Academy winners